The Gibraltar International Bank (GIB) is the national bank of Gibraltar. It was established in 2015 and is wholly owned by the Government of Gibraltar.

See also 

 List of banks in Gibraltar

References

External links
Gibraltar International Bank

Economy of Gibraltar
Banks of Gibraltar
Banks established in 2015
2015 establishments in Gibraltar